Clan Lindsay is a Scottish clan of the Scottish Lowlands.

History

Origins of the clan

The Lindsays were prominent in both England and Scotland from the late 11th century. The name most likely derives from the region of Lindsey in England (the name of which comes from the Old English for "island of Lincoln"), from where the family originated. 

In Domesday Book, Sir Baldric de Lindsay of Hemingby is recorded as holding a number of estates in Lindsey in 1086. Sir Baldric's sons, Sir Walter and William de Lindsay accompanied David of Scotland, Earl of Huntingdon, to claim his throne. William's son, William de Lindsay, sat in the Parliament of 1164 and was later a justiciar. William Lindsay held the lands of Crawford and Luffness. The chief's premier title was later Earl of Crawford. His son, Sir William Lindsay, who sat in Parliament as Baron of Luffness in East Lothian, married Alice de Limesi, and from their younger son Sir William Lindsay, dapifer to the High Steward of Scotland, descends the Earl of Crawford.

Sir William Lindsay's elder son was Sir David Lindsay who married a member of the royal family named Margerie. David died in 1214 and was succeeded as Lord Crawford and High Justiciar of Lothian by his son who was also called David. This David also inherited the estates of Limesi and Wolveray. One of his cousins was another Sir David Lindsay who was Chamberlain of Scotland in 1256.

Wars of Scottish Independence

The aforementioned David Lindsay's grandson was yet another David whose seal was appended to the letter of 1320 to the Pope, asserting the independence of Scotland, that was more often known as the Declaration of Arbroath. His second son, Sir James Lindsay, married Egidia, daughter of Walter Stewart, 6th High Steward of Scotland, and Marjory Bruce, daughter of Robert The Bruce and Isabella de Mar, and half-sister of David II of Scotland, son of Robert the Bruce and his second wife, Elizabeth de Burgh.

14th, 15th and 16th centuries

In 1390, Sir David Lindsay famously took part in a tournament at London Bridge, in the presence of Richard II of England. At the tournament Lindsay won the day and the admiration of the English king. Lindsay was created Earl of Crawford on 21 April 1398. In 1403, he was Lord High Admiral of Scotland and in 1406, he was sent as an ambassador to England.

The Lindsays fought at the Battle of Arbroath in 1445. In 1452, Alexander Lindsay, 4th Earl of Crawford, joined in a rebellion against James II of Scotland and fought at the Battle of Brechin where the royal forces were victorious. Alexander Lindsay was attained for treason but was later pardoned.

The fifth Earl of Crawford rose high in royal favour. He was successively Lord High Admiral of Scotland, Master of the Royal Household, Lord Chamberlain and High Justiciary. In 1488 he was created Duke of Montrose by King James III, but this was annulled after the king's death.  The sixth Earl of Crawford was killed at the Battle of Flodden in 1513, while on close attendance to King James IV.

17th century and civil war

Ludovic Lindsay, 16th Earl of Crawford, learned his trade as a soldier on the Continent. He later fought for King Charles I during the civil war where he commanded a cavalry regiment at the Battle of Marston Moor. He was later captured supporting James, Marquis of Montrose, at the Battle of Philiphaugh in 1645. The earldom of Crawford was succeeded to by his kinsman John Lindsay, Earl of Lindsay. The Crawford title remained with this branch of the family until it passed to the Earl of Balcarres in the 19th century, who were descended from a younger son of the ninth Earl of Crawford. This branch of the family had been created Earls of Balcarres in 1650 for services during the civil war.

18th century and Jacobite risings

The first Earl of Balcarres was made hereditary governor of Edinburgh Castle. He was also made Secretary of State for Scotland and High Commissioner to the General Assembly. His younger son was Colin Lindsay, 3rd Earl of Balcarres, who was a staunch Jacobite and fought during the Jacobite rising of 1715. He only escaped being attained for treason through the intervention of the Duke of Marlborough who was a lifelong friend of his. In 1739, John Lindsay, 20th Earl of Crawford, was made Lieutenant-Colonel of the newly formed 43rd Regiment of Foot ("Black Watch" regiment) that supported the British Government during the Jacobite rising of 1745 and had been formed from the ten Independent Highland Companies of "Black Watch".

Gallery of arms

Clan castles
Balcarres House is the current seat of the Chief. It was built by John Lindsay of Balcarres in 1595.
Edzell Castle was the original castle of the Chief of Clan Lindsay which they acquired in 1357 and retained ownership until 1715. 
Crawford Castle, to the north of the village of Crawford, South Lanarkshire, was from where the Earldom of Crawford was created and it was also known as Lindsay Tower.
Luffness Castle, East Lothian.
Lamberton Castle, Scottish Borders
Wauchope Castle, Dumfries and Galloway.
Carsluith Castle.
Spynie Palace.
Lordscairnie Castle.
Byres Castle, East Lothian.
Barnweill Castle, South Ayrshire.
Craigie Castle, South Ayrshire.
 Lindsane

See also
Earl of Crawford
Earl of Lindsay
Lord Spynie
Scottish clan

References

External links
clanlindsaysociety.co.uk
clanlindsay.com

 
Scottish clans
Scottish Lowlands